Sigurd Karlborg (born 23 June 1909) was a Swedish tennis player.

Tennis career
Karlborg won the Swedish national outdoor championship in 1936. In 1937 het represented Sweden in one Davis Cup tie, the  Europe Zone second round tie against Greece. Karlborg and Kalle Schröder played the singles rubbers, with Karlborg losing his first match against Georgios Nikolaides and thereafter also his second match against Lazaros Stalios.

See also
List of Sweden Davis Cup team representatives

References

External links
 

1909 births
Swedish male tennis players
Sportspeople from Linköping
Year of death missing
Sportspeople from Östergötland County